Mohamed El-Moctar Ould Khayar (born 26 May 1967) is a Mauritanian middle-distance runner

Khayar competed at the 1986 World Junior Championships in Athletics in the 1500 metres, where he finished 11th in his heat so didn't advance to the next round. Two years later he competed in the 1988 Summer Olympics in Seoul, he finished 15th in his heat of the 1500 metres, so again he didn't advance to the next round.

References

Mauritanian male middle-distance runners
Athletes (track and field) at the 1988 Summer Olympics
1967 births
Olympic athletes of Mauritania
Living people